The 1973–74 Serie A season was the 40th season of the Serie A, the top level of ice hockey in Italy. 10 teams participated in the league, and SG Cortina won the championship.

Final round

Placing round

External links
 Season on hockeytime.net

1973–74 in Italian ice hockey
Serie A (ice hockey) seasons
Italy